Philip John Ringwood (born ) is an English former cricketer. He was a right-handed batsman and a right-arm medium-pace bowler who played for Norfolk. He was born in King's Lynn.

Having represented the team in the Minor Counties Championship since 1982, Ringwood made a single List A appearance for the team, in the NatWest Trophy competition of 1983, against Glamorgan.

Ringwood continued to represent Norfolk until the 1987 Minor Counties Championship. In 2004, he made two appearances for Norfolk Over-50s in the Over-50 County Championship.

External links
Philip Ringwood at Cricket Archive

1953 births
Living people
Cricketers from King's Lynn
English cricketers
Norfolk cricketers